
Bunji (Urdu:بنجی) (Balti: بنجی) is a town in Astore District, Gilgit-Baltistan, Pakistan. it is historically important being in the end of Dogra rule before 1948 and on the edge of ancient Yagistan. It was economically hub for barter trade between Yagistan and Dogras. Bunji, located at the junction of Three Great Mountain Ranges, has its historical importance. The village has its prominent traces in the socio-political and economical situations of the region in History. Literacy rate of bunji is almost 100 percent except outsider coming from other places for jobs. River Indus covers the village from North to west while from eastern side it is connected with river Astore. Baltistan region joins its territory from the North-East.

Etymology 
The town was earlier known as Bawanji. By the 20th century, the name had been shortened to Bunji.

History 

Bunji is in the Astor principality, which came under the control of Skardu (Baltistan) during the rule of Ali Sher Khan Anchan.

The 19th century geographer Frederic Drew states that Bunji had significant agriculture and horticulture at this time. But it was laid "waste" during the invasions of Sulaiman Shah (ruler of Yasin, –1825), after which only a small area was cultivated.

General Zorawar Singh, the governor of Kishtwar under Raja Gulab Singh, conquered Skardu in 1840, and sent his forces to occupy Rondu and Astor. Raja Jabbar Khan of Astor eventually surrendered and he was sent to Zorawar Singh. However, the Sikh governor of Kashmir, Ghulam Mohiuddin, contested Zorawar Singh's claim, and retrieved control of Astor and reinstated Jabbar Khan as his subsidiary.

After the Dogras established the princely state of Jammu and Kashmir under British suzerainty (1846), the Dogras built a fort at Bunji and stationed troops there. Bunji was regarded as a strategic point on the road from Srinagar to Gilgit. In the early years of Dogra rule, Gilgit was repeatedly invaded by Raja Gauhar Rehman of Punial and Bunji troops became involved in the conflicts. The frontier states were subdued only after the British established the Gilgit Agency in 1889.

Until 1935, Bunji was part of the Astore tehsil of the Gilgit wazarat. After that date, the British leased the Gilgit tehsil to the north of Indus as the Gilgit leased area, and Astore became an independent wazarat administered as part of the Kashmir province of the state.

Shortly before the partition of India in 1947, the British transferred the Gilgit Agency to the Maharaja of Jammu and Kashmir. The 6th battalion of Jammu and Kashmir State Forces was sent to Bunji to support the Gilgit Agency (which had its own forces in the form of the Gilgit Scouts). The Muslim troops of the state force battalion, under the leadership of Mirza Hassan Khan, joined the rebellion raised by the Gilgit Scouts on 1 November 1947. Subsequently Bunji was attacked by the Gilgit Scouts and all the non-Muslims of the battalion were taken prisoner. Some of the non-Muslim forces escaped to Skardu where they held out till August 1948.

Geography

Climate 
Bunji has a cool arid climate (Köppen BWk), typical for Gilgit-Baltistan valleys though hotter than almost all other such localities.

The annual temperature averages . The hottest month is July and January is the coldest month of the year in Bunji.

Tourism 
Bunji is a tourist destination in Pakistan. The main attractions are the historic Bunji Mess and the Bunji Bridge.

Bunji Hydropower Project 
BHPP is a sub project of Pakistan with a planned capacity of 7100 MW, if constructed. Currently, this project is undergoing a feasibility study and detailed design. The companies conducting the feasibility and detailed design studies are involved in a joint venture, consisted of Mott MacDonald UK, Mott MacDonald Pakistan, Sogreah Consultants (France), Nippon Koei (Japan) and Development & Management consultants (Pakistan). This joint venture is known as Bunji Consultants Joint Venture (BCJV).

The proposed powerhouse is located in the Bunji village.

See also 

 Karakoram Highway
 Gorikot

References

Works cited
 
 
 
 

Populated places in Astore District
Cities in Pakistan